RPG-76 Komar (eng. Mosquito) is a disposable one-shot anti-tank grenade launcher that fires an unguided anti-tank rocket-propelled grenade.
The weapon was designed as a smaller and lighter alternative to the RPG-7, especially for use by airborne troops. Thanks to jet nozzles located between the warhead and the fuel compartment, it can be fired from inside of a building or a vehicle.

Design phase
In 1971 in the Polish Military Institute of Defense Technology a program codenamed “Argon” was begun. The goal of the project was to develop an anti-tank grenade launcher with a single use launch tube, which could supplement the RPG-7 launcher. Two versions were considered: a recoilless rifle and a rocket-propelled grenade launcher.  The rocket  variant was chosen because earlier experience gained during the development of the rocket assisted PGN-60 rifle grenade used by the Carbine-grenade launcher Kbkg wz. 1960. At this stage apart from the team of Polish scientists (Z.Zborowski, K.Kowalewski, T.Witczak, Z.Kapustka, A. Perełkowicz, K. Laskowski, Z.Kupidura), a team of Bulgarian scientists from the Military Institute of Research and Development in Sofia was also involved. The task of the Bulgarian scientists was to develop the rocket engine and the launcher. The presentation of the first prototype took place in 1973 on the III Central Military Invention and Rationalization Exhibition, the weapon was then designated as “HEAT grenade with single use launch tube RPG-73”. In 1980 a series of prototype launchers was produced. In the following years cooperation with Bulgarians has broken down, and the launcher was continued to be developed as a Polish only project.

Operational history
The weapon was adopted by the Polish Army in 1985 as the "RPG-76 Komar". With the warhead incapable of penetrating the front armor of modern western tanks it became an auxiliary weapon, not replacing standard issue RPG-7 grenade launchers in infantry squads. It was produced in the Precision works in Niewiadów, Poland. Around 100,000 were manufactured between 1983 and 1995.

In late 1990s it was withdrawn from front line units and store due to limited anti-tank capabilities and increased safety demands (a lack of self-destructor). Polish deployments in Iraq and Afghanistan changed this policy, and the weapon was deployed to troops, using the Komar in Iraq and in Afghanistan. Polish soldiers also used a small number of heavier multipurpose Carl Gustav recoilless rifles using a variety of modern ammunition types.

The weapon is shipped in wooden crates, each launcher is sealed in an airtight plastic sheet and 6 launchers are placed in each crate.

Komar is an effective anti-personnel weapon, against light armored vehicles and firing posts.

In March 2022, Poland started to deliver surplus RPG-76 to Ukraine as a response to the Russian invasion of Ukraine.

Users

Current users

Former users

Similar weapons 
Panzerfaust
M80 Rocket Launcher
RPG-18
M72 LAW

References

Rocket-propelled grenade launchers
Anti-tank rockets
Weapons of Poland
Military equipment introduced in the 1980s